We Will Always Love You is the third studio album from Australian electronic group The Avalanches, released on 11 December 2020 through Modular Recordings.

In March 2021 it was awarded the Australian Music Prize 2020.

At the 2021 ARIA Music Awards, the album was nominated for Album of the Year, Best Group and Best Pop Release while Robert Chater was nominated for Producer of the Year, Tony Espie was nominated for Engineer of the Year and Jonathan Zawada was nominated for Best Cover Art for work on this album.

At the J Awards of 2021, the album was nominated for Australian Album of the Year. At the 2021 Music Victoria Awards, the album was nominated for Best Victorian Album.

Background 
The Avalanches (Robbie Chater and Tony Di Blasi) released their second studio album, Wildflower, in 2016. As the album came 16 years after their debut Since I Left You, the group felt they now had a clean slate to work on new material. While on tour for Wildflower in early 2017, Chater left the tour to battle his alcoholism at a detox facility. Di Blasi continued the tour with a full backing band. After the tour completed, they began work on a new album. Before production began, Chater sold most of his collection of 7,000 records to nurture a fresh start.

Production 
We Will Always Love You is built on sampling, but it is less of a plunderphonics record than the band's previous material. Chater explained that making sample-based music is time-consuming. According to Chater, Since I Left You had 900 samples, and We Will Always Love You "still contains hundreds and hundreds of samples [...] fragmented across the record". The group set out to use samples as the basis of songs, but add instrumentation themselves to more easily and quickly build out the sound they were looking to achieve. The Avalanches brought in musician and friend Andrew Szekeres to help push production along in this manner. They also brought in guest vocalists because it takes less time than searching for samples for months. Chater still compared finding the right vocalist like searching for a sample.

One of the first songs recorded for the album was "Reflecting Light", which samples "Glow Worms" from the 1970 English folk record Just Another Diamond Day by Vashti Bunyan. The title track "We Will Always Love You" features vocals from Blood Orange and samples from "Hammond Song" by the Roches and "I'll Take You Any Way That You Come" by Smokey Robinson and the Miracles. "Running Red Lights" is dedicated to David Berman and features lyrics from the Purple Mountains song "Darkness and Cold". It features vocalists Pink Siifu and Rivers Cuomo. "Music Makes Me High" is a throwback to older house music from the Crydamoure label and on Basement Jaxx's debut album Remedy (1999). The lead sample from Salty Miller reminded Chater of "Red Alert". "Take Care in Your Dreaming" features vocalists Denzel Curry, Sampa the Great, and Tricky. Curry's verse was recorded in 2019 with the others recording in 2020.

The album features many collaborators: Sananda Maitreya, Vashti Bunyan, Blood Orange, Rivers Cuomo, Pink Siifu, Denzel Curry, Tricky, Sampa the Great, Leon Bridges, Johnny Marr, MGMT, Clypso, Neneh Cherry, Jamie xx, Kelly Moran, Cornelius, Karen O, Kurt Vile, Mick Jones, Cola Boyy, Perry Farrell, Wayne Coyne, and Orono.

Concept and artwork
The album's concept is rooted in "death, the afterlife, the stars, celestial beings and everything that's out there" in the context of their tendency to sample music from artists who have died. Chater explains:

The cover art features an image of Ann Druyan, creative director of the Voyager Golden Record project. The image, modified from the photo taken by Bettina Cirone around 1980, was run through a spectrograph, turned into sound, then processed back into an image. The group wanted to work with her after hearing that the sound of her heartbeat captured for the Golden Record was recorded the day after Carl Sagan proposed to her. They booked studio time to record her voice for the album, but she canceled the recording. She still gave them permission to use her image on the cover.

The album was almost titled "Pink Champagne" with cover art of a pink galaxy, but they thought it sounded too much like Drake.

Release and promotion
On 11 February 2020, the Avalanches posted a photo of a promotional billboard in Melbourne advertising a website. On the website, a video played containing several faint voices, followed by a Morse code message stating 'WWALY'. On 14 February, the website was updated with a second video containing another morse code message, this time spelling "20 FEB". Two days later on 16 February, the Avalanches posted a photo of a second billboard in London.

The first two singles released were "We Will Always Love You" on 20 February and "Running Red Lights" on 18 March 2020. The group originally only planned to release those two singles, and then the album in May, but because the COVID-19 pandemic delayed CD and vinyl pressings, management delayed the release. The vinyl plants in the United States shut down, leaving the group to use a plant in eastern Europe which could not deliver the record until December. The album was not officially announced until 9 September 2020. On 22 July, the group released the double A-sided single "Wherever You Go" /"Reflecting Light". Accompanying these singles were music video visualizers directed by Jonathan Zawada. Another double-A sided single "Music Makes Me High" / "Take Care in Your Dreaming", was released on 14 September. The fifth single was "Interstellar Love" released on 30 October. A live performance of the song was recorded for The Sound and aired on 15 November 2020. On 11 December 2020, the band released "The Divine Chord" with Johnny Marr and MGMT, alongside its music video.

Reception

We Will Always Love You received widespread acclaim from music critics. It carries a rating of "universal acclaim" on Metacritic with an average rating of 86/100 and was included in their list of 2020's best albums. The ABC hailed the album as a "genuine masterpiece", and Clash said that it was "arguably the best of The Avalanches' trio of releases thus far". Several reviews remarked favourably on the quality of the sampling on the album and its mature sound and themes. Mark Beaumont in The Independent noted that the group had "tempered their youthful party vibe to contemplate themes of the afterlife and cosmic profundity", while Julien A. Luebbers in The Spokesman-Review similarly remarked on the album's thematic sophistication, calling the album "a soaring testimony to spirituality and being part of something greater than ourselves" and "a piece of true artistic brilliance". On the other hand, PopMatters gave the sole review of the album marked "mixed" by Metacritic, criticising both the multiple guest appearances on the album and the "polemical" nature of its themes.

Track listing

Samples 
 "We Will Always Love You" contains portions of "I'll Take You Any Way That You Come", written by William "Smokey" Robinson, and performed by Smokey Robinson and the Miracles; and samples from "Hammond Song", written and composed by Margaret A. Roche, and performed by The Roches.
 "The Divine Chord" contains portions of "It's Love That Really Counts (In the Long Run)", written by Hal David and Burt Bacharach, and performed by the Shirelles.
 "Interstellar Love" contains samples from "Eye in the Sky", written by Alan Parsons and Eric Woolfson, as performed by the Alan Parsons Project.
 "Reflecting Lights" incorporates a sample of "Glow Worms", written and performed by Vashti Bunyan.
"We Go On" contains vocal samples of Karen Carpenter from The Carpenters' "Hurting Each Other" as the refrain.
 "Until Daylight Comes" contains a sample of "Sunshine", written by Robin Achampong and Delroy Murray, and performed by Total Contrast.
 "Wherever You Go" incorporates elements of "Magalenha" by Carlinhos Brown.
 "Music Makes Me High" contains a sample of "Music Makes Me High" written by Nelson B. Miller, and performed by Salty Miller; and excerpts from "Keep On Holdin' On", written by Stu Gardner and Billi Rucker, and performed by the Devoted Souls.
 "Take Care In Your Dreaming" contains a sample of Ghost Tape Number 10.
 "Gold Sky" contains a sample from "Last Train Home", written by Pat Metheny, and performed by the Pat Metheny Group.
 "Born to Lose" contains a sample of "Bad Bad News" written by Leon Bridges, Eric Frederic, Nate Mercereau, Wayne Hector, Austen Jenkins, Joshua Block and Chris Vivion; and incorporates elements of "Electric Counterpoint: I. Fast", written by Steve Reich and performed by Mats Bergström.
 "Music Is the Light" contains a sample of "Music Is the Light", written and performed by Sharon Lewis.

Personnel

 The Avalanches – instruments (1–11, 13–25)
 Robert Chater – production, mixing
 Tony Di Blasi – additional production (1–11, 13–15, 17–20, 22, 23, 25), mix supervision
 Andy Szekeres – additional production (1–11, 13–15, 17–20, 22, 23, 25), instruments (1–11, 13–25)
 iZNiiK – additional production (17)
 Devonté Hynes – vocals (3)
 The Australian Boys Choir – additional vocals (3)
 John Carroll Kirby – piano (3, 8, 17, 20), Moog (4, 8, 17), DX7 (4, 8), treated piano (24)
 Kelly Moran – prepared piano (3, 24), piano (24)
 MGMT – vocals (4), additional vocals (5)
 Johnny Marr – guitar (4)
 The Yarra Voices Choir – additional vocals (4, 11)
 Leon Bridges – vocals (6, 7)
 Orono – vocals (7, 25)
 Sananda Maitreya – vocals (8)
 Perry Farrell – vocals (10)
 Etty Farrell – additional vocals (10)
 Tom Rowlands – EMS and Roland System 700 synthesisers (10)
 Tricky – vocals (13, 17)
 Marta – vocals (13)
 Neneh Cherry – vocals (14)
 Clypso – vocals (14)
 Cameron McVey – additional vocals (14)
 Mick Jones – piano (14)
 East Coast Inspirational Singers – vocals (15)
 Pink Siifu – vocals (16, 20, 22)
 Denzel Curry – vocals (17)
 Sampa the Great – vocals (17)
 Kurt Vile – guitars (19), vocals (19)
 Wayne Coyne – additional vocals (19)
 Farmer Dave Scher – keyboards (19), lap steel (19), melodica (19)
 Karen O – vocals (21)
 Rivers Cuomo – vocals (22) 
 Mike Callander – additional modular tweaks (22), granular synths (22), tape delays (22), noise (22)
 Cornelius – vocals (24)
 Tony Espie – mix supervision
 Clint Welander – mix engineering (1–11, 13–24)
 Zachary Zajdel – assistant engineering (1–11, 13–24)
 Nate Haessly – assistant engineering (3, 4, 6, 20, 24)
 Joe LaPorta – mastering
 Christian Scallan – recording (choir on 3, 4, 10, 23; EME transmissions on 7–9), Arecibo message 2020 sonification (25)
 Jarvis Taveniere – recording (Kurt Vile and Farmer Dave Scher on 19)
 Jonathan Zawada – Barbara Payton sonification (12)
 Franck Marchis – Arecibo message 2020 sonification (25)

Charts

References

2020 albums
The Avalanches albums
Modular Recordings albums